Emil Miljković (born 26 May 1988) is a Bosnian-Herzegovinian footballer who played as a forward for EVV in the Dutch Topklasse.

Club career
Miljković left Bosnia with his parents when he was 7 years old and joined Roda JC Kerkrade's youth academy, where he spent 10 years. He then moved to Alemannia Aachen and played in Slovenia, Hungary and Croatia.

In January 2015, he left Dutch Hoofdklasse side Groene Ster for Belgian amateur club KFC De Kempen.

International career
Miljković was part of the Bosnia and Herzegovina U-21.

References

1988 births
Living people
People from Velika Kladuša
Association football forwards
Bosnia and Herzegovina footballers
Alemannia Aachen players
Fortuna Sittard players
NK Nafta Lendava players
Ferencvárosi TC footballers
NK Karlovac players
RKSV Groene Ster players
RKVV EVV players
Eerste Divisie players
Slovenian PrvaLiga players
Nemzeti Bajnokság I players
Nemzeti Bajnokság II players
Croatian Football League players
Derde Divisie players
Bosnia and Herzegovina expatriate footballers
Expatriate footballers in the Netherlands
Bosnia and Herzegovina expatriate sportspeople in the Netherlands
Expatriate footballers in Germany
Bosnia and Herzegovina expatriate sportspeople in Germany
Expatriate footballers in Slovenia
Bosnia and Herzegovina expatriate sportspeople in Slovenia
Expatriate footballers in Hungary
Bosnia and Herzegovina expatriate sportspeople in Hungary
Expatriate footballers in Croatia
Bosnia and Herzegovina expatriate sportspeople in Croatia
Expatriate footballers in Belgium
Bosnia and Herzegovina expatriate sportspeople in Belgium